Malik Ghulam Farid (1897–1977), was a notable Ahmadiyya scholar. He was deputed the task of preparing the 5 Volume The English Commentary of the Holy Quran, in 1942, by Mirza Mahmood Ahmad, the second Khalifa. He published the said Commentary in 1962. Later, in 1969, Malik published the Abridged Edition. Malik Ghulam Farid also produced a Dictionary of the Holy Quran, but it could not be published in his lifetime. He died in 1977.

References

Indian Ahmadis
1897 births
1977 deaths
Muslim missionaries